Pierre-Alexandre Aveline (1702–1760) was a French engraver, portraitist, illustrator, and printmaker.

Biography
Aveline was born in Paris into a family of artists, including his father Pierre Aveline and brother Antoine Aveline. In 1737 he joined the Académie de peinture et de sculpture (Royal Academy of Painting and Sculpture) in Paris. He primarily worked with copperplate in his engraving. He is best known for his reproductions of other artists' works. For example, The Signboard of the Gersaint Gallery is a reproduction of L'Enseigne de Gersaint by Antoine Watteau.

References

Further reading

External links

1702 births
1760 deaths
18th-century French engravers
Engravers from Paris